Richard Justin Lado (born 5 October 1979) is a South Sudanese football defensive midfielder who last played for Al-Malakia FC.  He was a member of the Sudan national football team. He scored the very first goal for South Sudan in an official international game.

External links 
 

1979 births
Living people
People from Khartoum
Sudanese people of South Sudanese descent
Sportspeople of South Sudanese descent
People with acquired South Sudanese citizenship
Sudanese footballers
South Sudanese footballers
Sudanese expatriate footballers
Sudan international footballers
South Sudan international footballers
2008 Africa Cup of Nations players
Association football midfielders
Dual internationalists (football)
Al-Hilal Club (Omdurman) players